State leaders in the 2nd century BC – State leaders in the 1st century– State leaders by year

This is a list of state leaders in the 1st century BC (100–1 BC).

Africa

Africa: Northcentral

Libya

Cyrene (complete list) –
Ptolemy Apion, King (c.147–96 BC)

Africa: Northeast

Egypt

Ptolemaic Kingdom of Egypt (complete list) –
Ptolemy IX Lathyros, Pharaoh (116–110 BC, 110–109 BC, 88–81 BC) 
Ptolemy X Alexander I, Pharaoh (110–109 BC, 107–88 BC)
Berenice III, Pharaoh (101–88 BC, 81–80 BC)
Ptolemy XI Alexander II, Pharaoh (80 BC)
Ptolemy XII Auletes, Pharaoh (80–58 BC, 55–51 BC)
Cleopatra VI, Pharaoh (58–57 BC)
Berenice IV, Pharaoh (58–55 BC)
Ptolemy XIII Theos Philopator, Pharaoh (51–47 BC)
Cleopatra VII, Pharaoh (51–30 BC)
Arsinoe IV, Queen (48–47 BC)
Ptolemy XIV, Pharaoh (47–44 BC)
Caesarion, Pharaoh (44–30 BC)

Nubia

Kush (complete list) –
Tanyidamani, Qore (2nd–1st century BC)
Naqyrinsan, Qore (early 1st century BC)
Aqrakamani, Qore (late 1st century BC)
Teriteqas, Qore (c.40 BC)
Amanirenas, Kandake, Queen Regent (c.40–10 BC)
Amanishakheto, Kandake, Queen Regent (c.10 BC–1 AD)
Amanitore, Kandake, Queen Co-regent (c.40–10 BC)
Amanikhabale, Qore (c.50–40 BC)

Africa: Northwest

Algeria

Numidia (complete list) –
Gauda, King (105–88 BC)
Hiempsal II, King (88–60 BC)
Juba I, King (60–46 BC)
Juba II, client King under Rome (29–25 BC)

Morocco

Mauretania (complete list) –
Bocchus I, King (c.110–c.80s BC)
Bocchus II, King (49–c.33 BC)
Bogud, Co-King (49–c.38 BC)
Juba II, client King under Rome (25 BC–23 AD)

Asia

Asia: East

China

Western Han, China (complete list) –
Wu, Emperor (141–87 BC)
Zhao, Emperor (87–74 BC)
Liu He, Emperor (74 BC)
Xuan Di Emperor (74–49 BC)
Yuan, Emperor (48–33 BC)
Cheng, Emperor (33–7 BC)
Ai, Emperor (7–1 BC)
Ping, Emperor (1 BC–5 AD)

Korea: Three Kingdoms

Baekje (complete list) –
Onjo, King (18 BC–28 AD)

Eastern Buyeo (complete list) –
Hae Buru, King (86–48 BC)
Geumwa, King (48–7 BC)
Daeso, King (7 BC–22 AD)

Goguryeo (complete list) –
Dongmyeong, King (37–19 BC)
Yuri, King (19 BC–18 AD)

Silla (complete list) –
Hyeokgeose, King (57 BC–4 AD)

Asia: South

India

Kanva dynasty (complete list) –
Vasudeva (c.75–c.66 BC)
Bhumimitra (c.66–c.52 BC)
Narayana (c.52–c.40 BC)
Susharman (c.40–c.30 BC)

Satavahana dynasty (Purana-based chronology) –
Satakarni II, King (141–85 BC)
Lambodara, King (85–67 BC)
Apilaka, King (67–55 BC)
Meghasvati, King (55–37 BC)
Svati, King (37–19 BC)
Skandasvati, King (19–12 BC)
Mrigendra Satakarni, King (12–9 BC)
Kunatala Satakarni, King (9–1 BC)
Satakarni III, King (1 BC–1 AD)

Northern Satraps (complete list) –
Hagamasha, Satrap (late 1st century BC)
Hagana, Satrap (late 1st century BC)

Shunga Empire (complete list) –
Devabhuti, Emperor (83–73 BC)

Pakistan

Apracharajas (complete list) –
Indravarman, Raja (1st century BC)
Vijayamitra, Raja (12 BC–15 AD)

Sri Lanka

Anuradhapura Kingdom (complete list) –
Pulahatta, King (103–100 BC)
Bahiya, King (100–98 BC)
Panya Mara, King (98–91 BC)
Pilaya Mara, King (91–90 BC)
Dathika, King (90–88 BC)
Valagamba, King (104–103, c.89–77 BC)
Mahakuli Mahatissa, King (76–62 BC)
Chora Naga, King (62–50 BC)
Kuda Tissa, King (50–47 BC)
Siva I, King (47–47 BC)
Vatuka, King (47–47 BC)
Darubhatika Tissa, King (47–47 BC)
Niliya, King (47–47 BC)
Anula, King (47–42 BC)
Kutakanna Tissa, King (42–20 BC)
Bhatikabhaya Abhaya, King (20 BC–9 AD)

Asia: West

Kingdom of Bithynia (complete list) –
Nicomedes III Euergetes, King (127–94 BC)
Nicomedes IV Philopator, King (94–74 BC)
Socrates Chrestus, King (c.90 BC)

Kingdom of Cappadocia (complete list) –
Ariarathes VIII, client King under Rome (101–96 BC)
Ariarathes IX, nominal King under Pontus (c. 95 BC)
Ariobarzanes I, client King (95–c.63 BC)
Ariobarzanes II, client King under Rome (c.63–51 BC)
Ariobarzanes III, client King under Rome (51–42 BC)
Ariarathes X, client King under Rome (42–36 BC)
Archelaus, client King under Rome (36 BC–17 AD)

Characene (complete list) –
Tiraios I, King (95/94–90/89 BC)
Tiraios II, King (79/78–49/48 BC)
Artabazos I, King (49/48–48/47 BC)
Attambelos I, King (47/46–25/24 BC)
Theonesios I, King (c.19/18)
Attambelos II, King (c.17/16 BC–8/9 AD)

Bosporan Kingdom (complete list) –
Asander, client King under Rome (47 BC, 44–17 BC)
Dynamis, client Queen under Rome (47–14 BC)
Mithridates, client King under Rome (47–44 BC)
Scribonius, King (17–16 BC)
Aspurgus, client King under Rome (8 BC–38 AD)

Colchis (complete list) –
Mithridates, client King under Pontus (fl. 65 BC)
Machares, client King under Pontus (fl. 65 BC)
Aristarchus, client King under Rome (65–47 BC)

Kingdom of Commagene (complete list) –
Mithridates I, King (109–70 BC)
Antiochus I, King (70–38 BC)
Mithridates II, King (38–20 BC)
Mithridates III, King (20–12 BC)
Antiochus III, King (12 BC–17 AD)

Elymais (complete list) –
Kamnaskires III Megas Nikephorus, client King under Parthia (c.85 BC)
Kamnaskires IV, client King under Parthia (c.82/1–c.76/5 BC)
Kamnaskires V, client King under Parthia (c.73/2–c.46 BC)
Kamnaskires VI, client King under Parthia (c.46–c.28 BC)
Kamnaskires VII, client King under Parthia (c.28 BC–c.1 AD)

Indo-Greek Kingdom (complete list) –
Antialcidas, King of Paropamisade, Arachosia, and Gandhara (115–95 BC)
Heliokles II, King of Gandhara and Punjab (110–100 BC)
Polyxenios, King of Paropamisade and Arachosia (c.100 BC)
Demetrius III, King of Gandhara and Punjab (c.100 BC)
Philoxenus, King of Paropamisade, Arachosia, Gandhara, and Punjab (100–95 BC)
Diomedes, King of Paropamisade (95–90 BC)
Amyntas, King of Arachosia and Gandhara (95–90 BC)
Epander, King of Punjab (95–90 BC)
Theophilos, King of Paropamisade (c.90 BC)
Peukolaos, King of Arachosia and Gandhara (c.90 BC)
Nicias, King of Paropamisade (90–85 BC)
Menander II, King of Arachosia and Gandhara (90–85 BC)
Hermaeus, King of Paropamisade (90–70 BC)
Archebius, King of Arachosia, Gandhara, and Punjab (90–80 BC)
Maues, Indo-Scythian King of Paropamisade, Arachosia, Gandhara, and Punjab (85–60 BC)
Artemidoros, King of Gandhara/Punjab (c.80 BC)
Apollodotus II, King of Punjab (80–65 BC)
Telephos, King of Gandhara (75–70 BC)
Hippostratos, King of Western Punjab (65–55 BC)
Dionysios, King of Eastern Punjab (65–55 BC)
Zoilos II, King of Eastern Punjab (55–35 BC)
Apollophanes, King of Eastern Punjab (35–25 BC)
Strato II and Strato III, Kings of Eastern Punjab (25 BC–10 AD)

Indo-Scythian Kingdom (complete list) –
Maues, King (c.85–60 BC)
Vonones, King (c.75–65 BC)
Spalahores, King (c.75–65 BC)
Spalirises, King (c.60–57 BC)
Azes I, King (c.57–35 BC)
Azilises, King (c.57–35 BC)
Azes II, King (c.35–12 BC)
Zeionises, Sub-king (c.10 BC–10 AD)
Kharahostes, Sub-king (c.10 BC–10 AD)

Judea: Hasmonean dynasty  (complete list) –
Alexander Jannaeus, King and High Priest (103–76 BC)
Alexandra Salome, Queen (76–67 BC)
John Hyrcanus II 
High Priest (76–66, 63–40 BC)
King (67–66 BC)
Ethnarch (47–40 BC)
Aristobulus II, King and High Priest (66–63 BC)
Antipater, Procurator (47–44 BC)
Antigonus, King and High Priest (40–37 BC)

Judea: Herodian dynasty (complete list) –
Herod the Great, client King under Rome (37–4 BC)

Nabataea (complete list) –
Aretas II, King (120/110–96 BC)
Obodas I, King (c.96–85 BC)
Aretas III, King (84–60/59 BC)
Obodas II, King (62/61–60/59 BC)
Malichus I, King (59–30 BC)
Obodas III, King (30–9 BC)
Aretas IV Philopatris, King (9/8 BC–39/40 AD)

Osroene (complete list) –
Bakru II, King (112–94 BC)
Ma'nu I, King (94 BC)
Abgar I, King (94–68 BC)
Abgar II, King (68–52 BC)
Ma'nu II, King (52–34 BC)
Paqor of, King (34–29 BC)
Abgar III, King (29–26 BC)
Abgar IV, King (26–23 BC)
Ma'nu III, King (23–4 BC)
Abgar V, King (4 BC–7 AD, 13–50)

Parthian Empire (complete list) –
Mithridates II, Great King, Shah (124–88 BC)
Gotarzes I, Great King, Shah (95–90 BC)
Orodes I, Great King, Shah (90–80 BC)
Sanatruces, Great King, Shah (77–70 BC)
Phraates III, Great King, Shah (70–57 BC)
Mithridates III, Great King, Shah (57–54 BC)
Orodes II, Great King, Shah (57–38 BC)
Pacorus I,§ Great King, Shah (51 BC)
Phraates IV, Great King, Shah (37–2 BC)
Tiridates II,§ Great King, Shah (32 BC)
Musa, Great Queen, Shah (2 BC–4 AD)
Phraates V, Great King, Shah (2 BC–4 AD)

Kingdom of Pontus (complete list) –
Mithridates VI, King (120–63 BC)
Pharnaces II, client King under Rome (63–47 BC)
Darius, client King under Rome (39–37 BC)
Arsaces, client King under Rome (c.37 BC)
Polemon I, client King under Rome (37–8 BC)
Pythodorida, client Queen under Rome (8 BC–38 AD)

Seleucid Empire (complete list) –
Antiochus IX Cyzicenus, King (114–96 BC)
Seleucus VI Epiphanes, King (96–95 BC)
Antiochus X Eusebes, King (95–92/83 BC)
Antiochus XI Epiphanes, King (95–87 BC)
Demetrius III Eucaerus, King (95–92 BC)
Philip I Philadelphus, King (95–84/83 BC)
Antiochus XII Dionysus, King (87–84 BC)
Seleucus VII Kybiosaktes, King (83–69 BC)
Antiochus XIII Asiaticus, King (69–64 BC)
Philip II Philoromaeus, King (65–63 BC)

Europe

Europe: Balkans
Sapaean kingdom of Thrace (complete list) –
Cotys I, King (57–48 BC)
Rhescuporis I, King (48–41 BC)

Odrysian kingdom of Thrace (complete list) –
Teres III, King (c.149 BC)
Beithys, King (140–120 BC)
Cotys V, King (120–? BC)
Sadalas I, King (87–79 BC)
Cotys VI, King (57–48 BC)
Sadalas II, King (48–42 BC)
Sadalas III, King (42–31 BC)
Rhescuporis II, King  (18–13 BC)
Rhascus, King (18–11 BC)
Rhoemetalces I, King (12 BC–12 AD)

Europe: British Isles
Atrebates (complete list) –
Commius, King (57–c.22 BC
Tincomarus, King (c.22–8 AD)
Eppillus, King (8–15)
Verica, King (15–40)

Catuvellauni (complete list) –
Cassivellaunus, Chieftain/Leader (c. 54 BC)
Tasciovanus, King (c.20 BC–9 AD)

Europe: Central
Marcomanni (complete list) –
Maroboduus, King (9 BC–19 AD)

Europe: East
Dacia (complete list) –
Charnabon, King (5th century BC)
Histrianorum, King (c.339 BC)
Cothelas, King (4th century BC) 
Dual, King (3rd century BC)
Rhemaxos, King (c.200 BC)
Moskon, King (3rd century BC)
Dromichaetes, King (3rd century BC)
Zalmodegicus, King (late 3rd century BC)
Rubobostes, King (2nd century BC)
Oroles, King (2nd century BC)
Dicomes, King (1st century BC)
Rholes, King (1st century BC)
Dapyx, King (1st century BC)
Cotiso, King (1st century BC)
Zyraxes, King (1st century BC)
Burebista, King (82–44 BC)
Comosicus, King (44 BC–28 AD)

Europe: South
Roman Republic (complete list) –

100
Gaius Marius, Consul
Lucius Valerius Flaccus, Consul
99
Marcus Antonius, Consul
Aulus Postumius Albinus, Consul
98
Quintus Caecilius Metellus Nepos, Consul
Titus Didius, Consul
97
Gnaeus Cornelius Lentulus, Consul
Publius Licinius Crassus, Consul
96
Gnaeus Domitius Ahenobarbus, Consul
Gaius Cassius Longinus, Consul
95
Lucius Licinius Crassus, Consul
Quintus Mucius Scaevola Pontifex, Consul
94
Gaius Coelius Caldus, Consul
Lucius Domitius Ahenobarbus, Consul
93
Gaius Valerius Flaccus, Consul
Marcus Herennius, Consul
92
Gaius Claudius Pulcher, Consul
Marcus Perperna, Consul
91
Lucius Marcius Philippus, Consul
Sextus Julius Caesar, Consul
90
Lucius Julius Caesar, Consul
Publius Rutilius Lupus, Consul
89
Gnaeus Pompeius Strabo, Consul
Lucius Porcius Cato, Consul
88
Lucius Cornelius Sulla, Consul
Quintus Pompeius Rufus, Consul
87
Gnaeus Octavius, Consul
Lucius Cornelius Cinna, Consul
Lucius Cornelius Merula, Suffect consul
86
Lucius Cornelius Cinna, Consul
Gaius Marius, Consul
Lucius Valerius Flaccus, Suffect consul
85
Lucius Cornelius Cinna, Consul
Gnaeus Papirius Carbo, Consul
84
Gnaeus Papirius Carbo, Consul
Lucius Cornelius Cinna, Consul
83
Lucius Cornelius Scipio Asiaticus, Consul
Gaius Norbanus, Consul
82
Gaius Marius the Younger, Consul
Gnaeus Papirius Carbo, Consul
81

Marcus Tullius Decula, Consul
Gnaeus Cornelius Dolabella, Consul
80
Lucius Cornelius Sulla, Consul
Quintus Caecilius Metellus Pius, Consul
79
Publius Servilius Vatia Isauricus, Consul
Appius Claudius Pulcher, Consul
78
Marcus Aemilius Lepidus, Consul
Quintus Lutatius Catulus, Consul
77
Decimus Junius Brutus, Consul
Mamercus Aemilius Lepidus Livianus, Consul
76
Gnaeus Octavius, Consul
Gaius Scribonius Curio, Consul
75
Lucius Octavius, Consul
Gaius Aurelius Cotta, Consul
74
Lucullus, Consul
Marcus Aurelius Cotta, Consul
73
Marcus Terentius Varro Lucullus, Consul
Gaius Cassius Longinus, Consul
72
Lucius Gellius Publicola, Consul
Gnaeus Cornelius Lentulus Clodianus, Consul
71
Publius Cornelius Lentulus Sura, Consul
Gnaeus Aufidius Orestes, Consul
70
Pompey, Consul
Marcus Licinius Crassus, Consul
69
Quintus Hortensius, Consul
Quintus Caecilius Metellus Creticus, Consul
68
Lucius Caecilius Metellus, Consul
Quintus Marcius Rex, Consul
67
Gaius Calpurnius Piso, Consul
Manius Acilius Glabrio, Consul
66
Manius Aemilius Lepidus, Consul
Lucius Volcatius Tullus, Consul
65
Lucius Aurelius Cotta, Consul
Lucius Manlius Torquatus, Consul
64
Lucius Julius Caesar, Consul
Gaius Marcius Figulus, Consul
63
Marcus Tullius Cicero, Consul
Gaius Antonius Hybrida, Consul
62
Decimus Junius Silanus, Consul
Lucius Licinius Murena, Consul
61
Marcus Pupius Piso Frugi Calpurnianus, Consul
Marcus Valerius Messalla Niger, Consul
60
Quintus Caecilius Metellus Celer, Consul
Lucius Afranius, Consul
59
Julius Caesar, Consul
Marcus Calpurnius Bibulus, Consul
58
Lucius Calpurnius Piso Caesoninus, Consul
Aulus Gabinius, Consul
57
Publius Cornelius Lentulus Spinther, Consul
Quintus Caecilius Metellus Nepos, Consul
56
Gnaeus Cornelius Lentulus Marcellinus, Consul
Lucius Marcius Philippus, Consul
55
Pompey, Consul
Marcus Licinius Crassus, Consul
54
Lucius Domitius Ahenobarbus, Consul
Appius Claudius Pulcher, Consul
53
Gnaeus Domitius Calvinus, Consul
Marcus Valerius Messalla Rufus, Consul
52
Pompey, Consul
Quintus Caecilius Metellus Pius Scipio Nasica, Consul
51
Servius Sulpicius Rufus, Consul
Marcus Claudius Marcellus, Consul
50
Lucius Aemilius Paullus, Consul
Gaius Claudius Marcellus, Consul
49
Gaius Claudius Marcellus, Consul
Lucius Cornelius Lentulus Crus, Consul

Roman Empire: Principate (complete list) –
Augustus/ Octavian, Principate, Emperor (27 BC–14 AD)

Eurasia: Caucasus

Kingdom of Armenia (complete list) –
Artaxiad Dynasty
Artavasdes I, King (123–95 BC)
Tigranes II, the Great, King (95–55 BC)
Artavasdes II, King (55–34 BC)
Artaxias II, King (33–20 BC)
Tigranes III, King (20–10 BC)
Tigranes IV, King, co-monarch (10–2 BC)
Erato, Queen, co-monarch (10–2 BC)
non-dynastic
Ariobarzanes, client King under Rome (2 BC–4)

Kingdom of Iberia (Kartli) (complete list) –
Pharnajom, King (109–90 BC)
Artaxias I, King (90–78 BC)
Artoces, King (78–63 BC)
Pharnavaz II, King (63–32 BC)
Mirian II, King (30–20 BC)
Arshak II, King (20 BC–1 AD)

References

1st century
-
1st-century BC rulers